Orca (also known as Orca: The Killer Whale) is a 1977 American thriller film directed by Michael Anderson and produced by Dino De Laurentiis, starring Richard Harris, Charlotte Rampling and Will Sampson. The film follows a male orca whale tracking down and getting revenge on a boat captain for killing the whale's pregnant mate and their unborn calf.

Upon release, the film was a minor box office success, but received mostly unfavorable reception from critics and audiences alike due to its similarities to the film Jaws, released two years prior.

In 2017, Umbrella Entertainment released Orca on Region B Blu-ray with a new 4-minute interview with Martha De Laurentiis. On June 30, 2020, Scream Factory released Orca on Region A Blu-ray with an improved video transfer.

Plot
Captain Nolan is an Irish Canadian living in South Harbour, Nova Scotia who catches marine animals in order to pay off the mortgage on his boat and eventually return to Ireland. Nolan's crew is currently looking for a great white shark for a local aquarium, but a marine biologist named Ken is targeted by the shark. An orca intervenes and kills the shark, saving Ken's life. This switches Nolan's target to the orca. Later while hunting with his crew, Nolan tries to capture what he believes to be a male orca, but mistakenly harpoons a pregnant female. Nolan and his crew get the orca on board, where she subsequently miscarries. The captain hoses the dead fetus overboard as her mate looks on, screaming in anguish.

Seeking release for his near-dead mate, the male orca tries to sink the ship. One of Nolan's crew members, Novak, cuts the female off the ship, but the male leaps up and drags him into the sea. The following day, the orca pushes his now-dead mate onto the shore. Al Swain, representative of the local fishermen's union, berates Nolan for his actions after finding the dead whale. Nolan denies responsibility, but Swain and the villagers eventually find out his involvement. The villagers insist that he kill the orca, as the whale's presence is causing the fish that are vital to the village's economy to migrate. The orca terrorizes the village by sinking fishing boats in broad daylight and then breaking pipelines, thus destroying the village's fuel reserves.

Rachel Bedford, a colleague of Ken's and a cetologist, shows Nolan how similar whales are to humans and tells him that, "If he (the orca) is like a human, what he wants isn't necessarily what he should have." Nolan confesses to Bedford that he empathizes with the whale, as his own wife and unborn child had previously been killed in a car crash caused by a drunk driver. Nolan promises Bedford that he will not fight the whale, but the orca attacks his seafront house where his injured crew member, Annie, is staying. The house starts slipping into the sea, and the whale bites Annie's left leg off. Nolan decides to fight the orca, but with Novak dead, and Annie maimed and unable to help, Nolan and Paul are now the only crew members left to take up pursuit. Bedford and Ken join the pursuit, along with Jacob Umilak, a Mi’kmaq enlisted for his ancestral knowledge on orcas.

The crew begins to follow the whale after he signals Nolan to follow him. Ken (who was saved by the orca at the beginning of the film) is leaning over the side when the whale surfaces and grabs him with its jaws, killing him. They follow the whale until they reach the Strait of Belle Isle, but when Paul starts to get into a lifeboat, the orca knocks Paul out of the boat and drowns him. The next day, the whale shoves an iceberg into the boat and starts to sink it. Nolan manages to harpoon the whale just as he and Bedford escape from the boat, but Umilak is crushed beneath an avalanche of ice just after sending out an SOS.

Nolan and Bedford hide on an iceberg, although Nolan slips onto another. The orca separates the icebergs, trapping Nolan. The whale jumps onto the ice, causing it to tilt and sending Nolan into the water. The whale lifts Nolan up with his tail and throws him onto another iceberg, killing him, while Bedford looks on helplessly. With his revenge complete, the whale swims southward under the ice, while a helicopter is seen coming to rescue Bedford.

Cast
 Richard Harris as Captain Nolan
 Charlotte Rampling as Rachel Bedford
 Will Sampson as Umilak
 Bo Derek as Annie
 Keenan Wynn as Novak
 Robert Carradine as Ken
 Peter Hooten as Paul
 Scott Walker as Al Swain
 Don "Red" Barry as Doc Worker
 Yaka and Nepo as The Orca

Production
Producer Luciano Vincenzoni was first assigned to give the film a head start after being called by Dino de Laurentiis in the middle of the night in 1975. Upon admitting that he had watched the film Jaws, Vincenzoni was instructed by de Laurentiis to "find a fish tougher and more terrible than the great white". Having had little interest in sea life beforehand, Vincenzoni was directed to killer whales by his brother Adriano, who had a personal interest in zoology. Filming took place largely in Newfoundland during the fishing season. Most filming took place in the town of Petty Harbour, about 15 kilometres south of the capital city, St. John's.

The main orcas used for filming were trained animals from Marineland of the Pacific and Marine World Africa (Six Flags Discovery Kingdom), though artificial rubber whales were also used. These models were so lifelike that several animal rights activists blocked the trucks transporting them, confusing them for real orcas. The shark used early in the film was captured by noted shark hunter Ron Taylor. The scenery meant to represent a remote polar region of Labrador was fabricated in Malta by designer Mario Garbuglia.

According to Vincenzoni, Richard Harris had begun to drink heavily on set after reading a tabloid magazine and seeing a photograph of his wife Ann Turkel on a beach with a younger man. He reportedly intended to stop performing and fly to Malibu in order to kill them, relenting only after getting into a brawl which resulted in Vincenzoni getting a black eye. The 46-year-old Harris insisted on performing his own stunts in the polar sequences and was nearly killed on several occasions.

Reception
The film grossed $3.5 million from 775 theatres in its opening weekend and went on to gross $14,717,854 in the United States and Canada.

On the review aggregator website Rotten Tomatoes, the film holds an approval rating of 9% based on 35 reviews and an average rating of 3.6/10. The site's critical consensus reads: "Content to regurgitate bits of better horror movies, Orca: The Killer Whale is a soggy shark thriller with frustratingly little bite." A contemporary review published by Variety called the film "man-vs-beast nonsense", and lamented that "fine special effects and underwater camera work are plowed under in dumb story-telling." Richard Schickel of Time wrote that the filmmakers behind Orca "thumbed heavily through the literature of the sea in their search for dramatic cliches", and called the film "inept" and "suspenselessly shot". Gary Arnold of The Washington Post criticized the film's special effects and referred to it as "essentially a rehash of an earlier De Laurentiis hit, Death Wish, with the killer whale in Charles Bronson role."

Orca has been unfavorably compared to Jaws. Both Schickel and Arnold drew comparisons between the films, and Bob Thomas of the Associated Press called it "just another attempt to copy Jaws". Dave Kehr of the Chicago Reader called the film an "incoherent blend of Moby-Dick, King Kong, and Jaws, hindered by what appears to be extensive reediting". However, Richard Harris enjoyed his experiences during filming and took offence at comparisons between Orca and Jaws.

See also
 List of American films of 1977
 List of natural horror films
 Namu, the Killer Whale a 1966 movie about an Orca who was studied by a marine biologist in a small fishing village after the death of its mate in an effort to understand it.

References

External links
 
 
 
 
 

1977 films
1977 horror films
1970s disaster films
1977 independent films
American disaster films
American independent films
American natural horror films
1970s English-language films
Films about dolphins
American films about revenge
Films about whales
Films based on American horror novels
Films directed by Michael Anderson
Films scored by Ennio Morricone
Films shot in Malta
Films shot in Newfoundland and Labrador
Paramount Pictures films
Films with screenplays by Luciano Vincenzoni
Films with screenplays by Sergio Donati
Fictional orcas
Avalanches in film
Films set on boats
1970s American films